National Route 25 is a national highway in South Korea connecting Changwon to Sangdang District, Cheongju. It established on 31 August 1971.

Main stopovers
South Gyeongsang Province
 Changwon (Jinhae District - Seongsan District - Uichang District) - Gimhae - Uichang District - Miryang
North Gyeongsang Province
 Cheongdo County - Gyeongsan
Daegu
 Suseong District - Dong District - Buk District - Seo District - Buk District
North Gyeongsang Province
 Chilgok County - Gumi - Uiseong County - Sangju
North Chungcheong Province
 Boeun County - Cheongju (Sangdang District)

Major intersections

 (■): Motorway
IS: Intersection, IC: Interchange

South Gyeongsang Province

North Gyeongsang Province (South Daegu)

Daegu

North Gyeongsang Province (North Daegu)

North Chungcheong Province

References

25
Roads in North Chungcheong
Roads in South Gyeongsang
Roads in North Gyeongsang
Roads in Daegu